Sandamani Pagoda (formally ) is a Buddhist stupa located southwest of Mandalay Hill. It was commissioned by King Mindon Min in 1874 as a memorial to Mindon Min's younger brother, Kanaung Mintha, who was assassinated along with 3 princes, Malun, Saku, and Maingpyin, during the 1866 Myingun Prince rebellion.  The pagoda was erected at the provisional location of the royal palace, the Nanmyay Bontha.

This pagoda contains the graves of the Kanaung, Sagu Mintha, Malun and Maingpyin Princes. It also contains an iron image of the Buddha cast by Bodawpaya in 1802, and removed from Amarapura by Mindon in 1874. The statue reportedly weighs .

Notes

References

Pagodas in Myanmar
Buddhist temples in Mandalay
19th-century Buddhist temples
Religious buildings and structures completed in 1874